Champion Chaalbaaz No.1 is an Indian reality show that aired on Sony Entertainment Television from 22 December 2007 to 12 April 2008. The series is an Indian adaption of the American show Pranksters.

Concept
Champion Chaalbaaz No. 1 was a simple reality-based comedy format show that brought 33 contestants, who played pranks and put their ‘mischievous best’ foot forward to prove their talent. All the contestants were critiqued and judged by the judges and the live studio audience. And every episode also featured a celebrity prankster, which served as the icing on the cake. Besides that the reality based comedy extravaganza showcased the lighter and mischievous side of the Indian common man.

Host/anchor
Shonal Rawat
Mona Singh

Judges
Cyrus Broacha
Sajid Khan

References

External links
Official Site

Sony Entertainment Television original programming
2007 Indian television series debuts
2008 Indian television series endings
Indian reality television series
Hidden camera television series